Brahma is surname used by Boros of Assam. This surname was taken by followers of Brahma religion founded by Kalicharan Brahma.

Geographical distribution
As of 2014, 99.3% of all known bearers of the surname Brahma were residents of India. The frequency of the surname was higher than national average in only one state:
 1. Assam (1: 105)

Notable people
 Kalicharan Brahma (1860-1938), Social reformer
 Rupnath Brahma (1902-1968), politician
 Madaram Brahma (1903-1990), poet
 Harishankar Brahma, Chief Election Commissioner of India
 Kameshwar Brahma, president of Bodo Sahitya Sabha
 Prem Singh Brahma, Politician
 Upendranath Brahma (1956-1999), father of the Bodos
 Urkhao Gwra Brahma, politician
 Bineswar Brahma, academic

References

Bibliography

Indian surnames